Into the Half Moon (stylized as into the half moon.) is the debut studio album by the American alternative metal band 10 Years, independently released on August 13, 2001. The album was highly promoted on the band's original website (www.10years1.com), with "What the Fuck" being available for download a few months before the official release. The song "When Will You Breathe?" debuted on a local radio station along with "Fallaway".

Background
This is the only 10 Years release to feature original vocalist Mike Underdown, who left the band in 2002. The album is not listed on the band's official website, with some considering this earlier incarnation of 10 Years to be a different band. Guitarist Matt Wantland stated "We did start the band in 1999. The original people who in the band were me, Tater [Ryan Johnson] the guitar player, Brian [Vodinh] the drummer, a different singer for a few years, Mike [Underdown], and Lewis [Cosby], who plays bass. It was probably 2002 when Jesse joined the band, so I guess some people look at that like the full creation of 10 Years but we’ve been doing it for a little over a decade now." The album name comes from a poem on the inside of the booklet.

Music and Lyrics
The album features screamed vocals, in contrast to most of the band's later releases with singer Jesse Hasek. This album also contains the heaviest song of their career, "Try Again," with the vocalist screaming for about 7 seconds during the bridge. The song "When Will You Breathe?" was written and
performed by drummer Brian Vondinh. "Dragonfaith" was written and performed by Michael Underdown.

The band's Deftones influences are also the most prominent in this album out of all their releases, most notably in the tracks "Vicious (Parasite)" and "Nightingale".

Track listing

Personnel
10 Years
 Mike Underdown (Credited as Michael Lee) – vocals
 Ryan "Tater" Johnson – guitars
 Matt Wantland – guitars
 Andy Parks – bass
 Brian Vodinh – drums, vocals on track 5

Additional
Travis Wyreck – production, mixing
10 Years – production
Seva David-Louis Ball – mastering
Donald Lyles – additional engineering
Scott Hoaglan – additional engineering

References

10 Years (band) albums
2001 debut albums
Self-released albums